In theoretical computer science, the word RAM (word random-access machine) model is a model of computation in which a random-access machine does bitwise operations on a word of  bits. Michael Fredman and Dan Willard created it in 1990 to simulate programming languages like C.

Model 
The word RAM model is an abstract machine similar to a random-access machine, but with additional capabilities. It works with words of size up to  bits, meaning it can store integers up to size . The model allows bitwise operations such as arithmetic and logical shifts to be done in constant time.

Algorithms and data structures 
In the word RAM model, integer sorting can be done fairly efficiently. Yijie Han and Mikkel Thorup created a randomized algorithm to sort integers in expected time  of (in Big O notation) , while Han also created a deterministic variant with running time .

The dynamic predecessor problem is also commonly analyzed in the word RAM model, and was the original motivation for the model. Dan Willard used y-fast tries to solve this in  time. Michael Fredman and Willard also solved the problem using fusion trees in  time.

See also 
 Transdichotomous model

References 

 Models of computation